Sarah Gray (born 28 October 1990, Cambridge, New Zealand) is a New Zealand rower.

Under national coach Dick Tonks, Gray was placed in a women's quadruple scull with Fiona Bourke, Eve MacFarlane, and Louise Trappitt. They surprised themselves by winning bronze at the regattas in Hamburg (Germany) and Lucerne (Switzerland). They maintained their form and won a bronze at the 2011 World Rowing Championships at Lake Bled in Bled, Slovenia.

At the 2012 Summer Olympics, she competed in the women's quadruple sculls.

She is also an equine veterinarian at the University of California's William R. Pritchard Veterinary Medical Teaching Hospital in Davis. There, among her patients, she successfully treated a Western Classic Barrel racing champion for extensive lacerations, and aided his return to top form. Her work with horses has been featured in literary works like Equine ER: Stories from a Year in the Life of an Equine Veterinary Hospital by Leslie Guttman.

References

1990 births
Living people
New Zealand female rowers
Olympic rowers of New Zealand
Rowers at the 2012 Summer Olympics
World Rowing Championships medalists for New Zealand

People from Cambridge, New Zealand
21st-century New Zealand women